The SMW United States Junior Heavyweight Championship was a singles title in Smoky Mountain Wrestling. It existed from 1992 until the promotion's close in 1995. There were three officially recognized champions and eight title reigns, with Bobby Blaze holding the title a record four times. Because the championship is a professional wrestling championship, it is won and lost competitively. The championship is awarded after the Wrestler who is more “over” wins the match.

Title history

See also
Smoky Mountain Wrestling

Explanatory footnotes

References

Junior heavyweight wrestling championships
Smoky Mountain Wrestling championships
United States professional wrestling championships